The Government of the United Kingdom is divided up into departments. These, according to the government, are responsible for putting government policy into practice. There are currently 24 ministerial departments, 20 non-ministerial departments and 422 agencies and other public bodies, for a total of 465 departments.

Ministerial departments 

Ministerial departments are generally the most high-profile government departments and differ from the other two types of government departments in that they include ministers. A list of all ministeral departments is shown below.

Non-ministerial departments 

Non-ministerial departments are headed by civil servants and usually have a regulatory or inspection function. A list of all non-ministerial departments is shown below.

Agencies and other public bodies 
Government departments in this third and final category can generally be split into five types:
 Executive agencies, which usually provide government services rather than decide policy
 Executive non-departmental public bodies, which do work for the government in specific areas
 Advisory non-departmental public bodies, which provide independent and expert advice to ministers
 Tribunal non-departmental public bodies, which are part of the justice system and have jurisdiction over a specific area of the law
 Independent monitoring boards, which are responsible for the running of prisons and the treatment of prisoners

See also 
 Office of the Prime Minister
 Politics of the United Kingdom

Notes

References

External links 
 How government works - GOV.UK
 Departments, agencies and public bodies - GOV.UK